In cryptography, the Generalized DES Scheme (GDES or G-DES) is a variant of the DES symmetric-key block cipher designed with the intention of speeding up the encryption process while improving its security. The scheme was proposed by Ingrid Schaumuller-Bichl in 1981.

In 1990, Eli Biham and Adi Shamir showed that GDES was vulnerable to differential cryptanalysis, and that any GDES variant faster than DES is also less secure than DES.

GDES generalizes the Feistel network structure of DES to larger block sizes. In each round, the DES round function is applied to the rightmost 32-bit subblock, and the result is XORed with all the other parts. Then the block is rotated 32 bits to the right.

References
 Eli Biham, Adi Shamir: Differential Cryptanalysis of DES-like Cryptosystems. CRYPTO 1990: 2-21
 Ingrid Schaumuller-Bichl, Zur Analyse des Data Encryption Standard und Synthese Verwandter Chiffriersysteme, Ph.D. Thesis, Linz university, May 1981. (In German).
 I. Schaumuller-Bichl, "On the Design and Analysis of New Cipher Systems Related to DES," Technical Report, Linz University, 1983.
 

Broken block ciphers
Data Encryption Standard